Ambeyrac is a commune in the Aveyron department in the Occitanie region of southern France.

The inhabitants of the commune are known as Ambairacois or Ambairacoises

Geography
Ambeyrac is located some 15 km south-west of Figeac and 25 km north-west of Villefranche-de-Rouergue with its northern border being the border between the departments of Aveyron and Lot. It can be accessed by the D86 road from Balaguier-d'Olt in the north-east which passes through the village and continues south to La Capelle-Balaguier. The minor D127 road also goes west from the village to Saujac.

The northern border of the commune is formed entirely by the Lot river for which there are no crossing points in the commune. The Ruisseau de Flaucou flows from the south through the commune and the village to join the Lot.

Neighbouring communes and villages

Administration

List of Successive Mayors

Due to the death of Roland Théron, Émilie Cazajus was elected mayor in 2009.

Population

Sites and monuments

The Chateau of Camboulan (16th century) is registered as an historical monument.
A Tithe barn has been converted into a hall with two levels.

Church Interior

See also
Communes of the Aveyron department

Bibliography
Christian-Pierre Bedel (preface by Raymond Audouard), Vilanòva: Ambairac, La Capèla, Montsalés, Òls, Sanch-Igèst, Santa-Crotz, Sent-Remèsi, Sauvanhac, Saujac / Christian-Pierre Bedel e los estatjants del canton de Vilanòva, Rodez, Mission départementale de la culture, coll.  Al canton, 1995, ill., cov. ill. 28 cm, 247 p. (BnF FRBNF36688568)

References

External links
Ambeyrac on the National Geographic Institute website 
Ambeyrac on the Community of communes of Villeneuvois, Diège et Lot website 
Ambeyrac on Géoportail, National Geographic Institute (IGN) website 
Ambayrac on the 1750 Cassini Map

Communes of Aveyron